Jaan Järve (7 October 1894 Puhja, Kreis Dorpat – 13 February 1945 Freudenstadt, Germany) was an Estonian politician. He was a member of I Riigikogu.

In 1921, Järve was the Second Assistant Chairmen of I Riigikogu. In 1944, he fled to Germany during the Second World War; he was killed in an air raid in February 1945 aged 50.

References

1894 births
1945 deaths
People from Elva Parish
People from Kreis Dorpat
Estonian Lutheran clergy
Estonian People's Party politicians
Christian People's Party (Estonia) politicians
National Centre Party (Estonia) politicians
Members of the Estonian Constituent Assembly
Members of the Riigikogu, 1920–1923
Members of the Riigikogu, 1929–1932
Members of the Estonian National Assembly
University of Tartu alumni
Humboldt University of Berlin alumni
Estonian military personnel of the Estonian War of Independence
Estonian World War II refugees
Estonian emigrants to Germany
Civilians killed in World War II
Deaths by airstrike during World War II